Pseudosophronia cosmella is a moth of the family Gelechiidae. It was described by Constant in 1885. It is found in Portugal, Spain and on Corsica.

References

Moths described in 1885
Anacampsini